Helmuth Setzkorn is a retired East German slalom canoeist who competed in the mid-1950s. He won a silver medal in the folding K-1 team event at the 1953 ICF Canoe Slalom World Championships in Meran.

References

German male canoeists
Possibly living people
Year of birth missing
Medalists at the ICF Canoe Slalom World Championships